= Maria Chapel =

Former chapel in Hoorn, the Netherlands

Coordinates: 52°38′31″N 5°03′38″E

The Maria Chapel is a former chapel in Hoorn, the Netherlands. It was part of the Maria convent between 1408 and 1573. Initially it was of wooden construction. It served as a church and orphanage from 1574 to 1958, and then was used as part of the city hall until 1977. In its current form the chapel hosts a hotel and an artist-in-residence program by the non-profit organization Hotel Maria Kapel,.
